Francisco Bustamente (11 May 1908 – 24 January 1983) was a Mexican sports shooter. He competed in the 25 m pistol event at the 1948 Summer Olympics.

References

1908 births
1983 deaths
Mexican male sport shooters
Olympic shooters of Mexico
Shooters at the 1948 Summer Olympics
People from Oaxaca
20th-century Mexican people